Adam Mateusz Danch (born 15 December 1987, in Ruda Śląska) is a Polish footballer who plays as a centre-back for III liga side LKS Goczałkowice-Zdrój.

Career

Gwarek Zabrze
Danch started out at Gwarek Zabrze in the 2004–05 season and spent two seasons with the club.

Gornik Zabrze
On 1 July 2006, Danch moved to Gornik Zabrze for €20,000. He would go on to spend a decade at the club, making 303 appearances and scoring 10 goals. On 27 April 2017, Danch was let go by the club and he became a free agent.

Arka Gdynia
On 19 June 2017, Arka Gdynia approached Danch and offered him a two-year contract. On 6 December 2021, he left the club by mutual consent.

International career
Danch played for the Poland U20 national team, starting in all four of Poland's games at the 2007 FIFA U-20 World Cup.

On 21 November 2008 Danch was called up by the Polish national team coach Leo Beenhakker for friendly matches in Antalya, Turkey.

Career statistics

References

External links 
 
 
 

1987 births
Living people
Ekstraklasa players
I liga players
III liga players
Górnik Zabrze players
Arka Gdynia players
LKS Goczałkowice-Zdrój players
Polish footballers
Poland youth international footballers
Poland under-21 international footballers
Poland international footballers
Sportspeople from Ruda Śląska
Association football defenders